Karen Susman (née Hantze; born December 11, 1942) is a retired female tennis player from the United States. She won the 1962 women's singles title at Wimbledon, defeating Věra Pužejová Suková in the final 6–4, 6–4, but did not defend her title in 1963. She won three Grand Slam women's doubles titles, all with Billie Jean King. She also won the 1960 Wimbledon junior girls' singles title.

Tennis career
Susman and Billie Jean Moffitt, as an unseeded team, won the 1961 women's doubles title at Wimbledon, defeating the third-seeded team of Jan Lehane and Margaret Smith in the final 6–3, 6–4. Susman and Moffitt successfully defended their title in 1962, defeating the South African team of Renée Schuurman and Sandra Reynolds in the final 5–7, 6–3, 7–5. Susman and Moffitt reached the 1964 women's doubles final at Wimbledon, losing to the top-seeded team of Smith and Lesley Turner 7–5, 6–2. For Wimbledon's centenary celebration in 1977, Susman and (Moffitt) King teamed for the last time. As the eighth-seeded team, they were upset in the second round by the team of Mary Carillo and Trish Bostrom 7–9, 6–4, 6–3.

Susman and Moffitt won the 1964 women's doubles title at the U.S. Championships, defeating Smith and Turner in the final 3–6, 6–2, 6–4. Susman and Moffitt reached the 1962 women's doubles final at the U.S. Championships, losing to the team of Maria Bueno and Darlene Hard 4–6, 6–3, 6–2. They also reached the 1965 women's doubles final at the U.S. Championships, losing to the team of Nancy Richey and Carole Caldwell Graebner 6–4, 6–4. Susman gave birth to her only child in October 1963 and played very little in 1963, deciding not to defend her Wimbledon singles and doubles titles. She returned to play in 1964, and at Wimbledon, she lost in a third-round match to Margaret Smith. She entered the U.S. Championships the same year, but withdrew before the tournament. Susman played little in the 1960s and 1970s, but joined the start of Team Tennis in the U.S. in 1974 and made occasional tournament appearances, returning to Wimbledon once and the US Open, where her last Grand Slam singles tournament was at the 1980 US Open. She defeated Tanya Harford in the first round 3–6, 6–2, 6–4 and Janet Newberry in the second round 7–5, 6–1, then lost to 14th-seeded Ivanna Madruga 6–3, 6–1.

According to Lance Tingay of The Daily Telegraph and the Daily Mail, Susman was ranked in the world top 10 in 1961, 1962, and 1964, reaching a career high of world no. 4 in 1962. Susman was included in the year-end top 10 rankings issued by the United States Lawn Tennis Association from 1959 through 1962 and in 1964. She was the second-ranked U.S. player behind Hard from 1960 through 1962.

Grand Slam finals

Singles: 1 (1 title)

Doubles: 6 (3 titles, 3 runners-up)

Grand Slam singles tournament timeline

Note: The Australian Open was held twice in 1977, in January and December.

See also 
 Performance timelines for all female tennis players who reached at least one Grand Slam final

References

External links
 
 
 

1942 births
Living people
American female tennis players
Tennis players from San Diego
United States National champions (tennis)
Wimbledon champions (pre-Open Era)
Grand Slam (tennis) champions in women's singles
Grand Slam (tennis) champions in women's doubles
Grand Slam (tennis) champions in girls' singles
Wimbledon junior champions
21st-century American women